József Rusznyák (born 6 January 1947 in Végardó) is a Hungarian former wrestler who competed in the 1968 Summer Olympics and in the 1972 Summer Olympics.

References

External links 
 
 

1947 births
Living people
Olympic wrestlers of Hungary
Wrestlers at the 1968 Summer Olympics
Wrestlers at the 1972 Summer Olympics
Hungarian male sport wrestlers